Drunk Horse is a rock band from Oakland, California. Formed in 1998, the band released several albums on Man's Ruin Records before the label went out of business. The band then moved on to Tee Pee Records with 2003's Adult Situations, which was followed in 2005 by In Tongues. Drunk Horse has toured in the US and Europe.  The band has played Austin, Texas' South by Southwest Festival several times.

Members

Current
 Cyrus Comiskey
 Cripe Jergensen
 Eli Eckert
 Joel Robinow

Former
 John Niles
 Isaiah Mitchell
 Josh Smith

Discography

Albums
Drunk Horse CD, Man's Ruin Records (1999)
Drunk Horse LP, Man's Ruin Records/Oakland Pants Factory (1999)
Tanning Salon/Biblical Proportions CD, Man's Ruin Records (2001)
Adult Situations CD, Tee Pee Records (2003)
In Tongues CD/LP, Tee Pee Records/Wantage USA (2005)
Live in Utah CD, Silver Current Records (2014)

Singles/EPs
Bambi/Dirty Mind 7", Wantage USA
Unearthed Gems Vol. 2 7"
"Independent Type / Joint of Lamb" Split Single w/ The Feather (Delboy Records) 2004

Compilation appearances
Oakland The Secret is Out "One Track Woman" CD, Warm and Fuzzy Records
Port Lite Compilation "Secret Ingredient" CD, Food Stamp Records (2000)
Right In The Nuts: A Tribute to Aerosmith "Kings and Queens" CD, Man's Ruin Records
Wantage USA's 21st Release Hits Omnibus 2XCD, Wantage USA

Influence
Author Ned Vizzini's novel Be More Chill, about a guy who takes a pill called a squip that makes him cooler, was partly inspired by "AM/FM Shoes", a song from Tanning Salon/Biblical Proportions. He writes that "'AM/FM Shoes' is about a guy who feels like a loser, except he has special shoes that play the radio, and when he puts them on, he becomes the coolest guy around."

References

External links
Drunk Horse @ MySpace
Review of In Tongues by the SF Weekly
Drunk Horse review in the Austin Chronicle
L.A. Weekly article

Rock music groups from California
American stoner rock musical groups